Events from the year 1894 in France.

Incumbents
President: Marie François Sadi Carnot (until 26 June), Jean Casimir-Perier (starting 26 June)
President of the Council of Ministers: Jean Casimir-Perier (until 30 May), Charles Dupuy (starting 30 May)

Events
 4 January – Franco-Russian Alliance: A military alliance is established between France and the Russian Empire, pledged to remain so as long as the Triple Alliance (1882) exists.
 12 February – Anarchist Émile Henry sets off a bomb in a Paris café, killing one person and wounding twenty.
 15 February (04:51 GMT) – French anarchist Martial Bourdin attempts to destroy the Royal Greenwich Observatory, London, England with a bomb.
 22 June – Dahomey becomes a French colony.
 23 June – International Olympic Committee is founded at the Sorbonne, Paris, at the initiative of Baron Pierre de Coubertin.
 24 June – Assassination of Marie François Sadi Carnot, President of France.
 15 August – Sante Geronimo Caserio is executed for the assassination of Marie François Sadi Carnot.
 15 October – Alfred Dreyfus is arrested for spying: Dreyfus affair begins.
 5 November – Crédit Agricole established.
 7 November – The Masonic Grand Lodge de France is founded, splitting from the larger and older Grand Orient de France.
 19 December – Trial and conviction of Alfred Dreyfus begins at the Cherche-Midi prison and lasts four days.
 22 December – Alfred Dreyfus is convicted of treason.
 31 December – Dreyfus' appeal to the military court of revision — a formality — is rejected.
 Émile Delahaye produces the first Delahaye automobile in Tours.

Arts and literature
 Paul Cézanne paints Rideau, Cruchon et Compotier.

 Claude Debussy composes premieres Prélude à l'après-midi d'un faune in December 1894, a symphonic poem based on Stéphane Mallarmé.

Births

January to June
 12 January – Georges Carpentier, boxer (died 1975)
 18 January – Romain Bellenger, cyclist (died 1981)
 6 February – André Marchal, organist and organ teacher (died 1980)
 14 March – Marie-Simone Capony, teacher, fifth-oldest person in the world (died 2007)
 26 March – Albert Achard, World War I flying ace (died 1972)
 9 April – Jean Gounot, gymnast and Olympic medallist (died 1978)
 23 April – Georges Renavent, actor (died 1969)
 10 May – Paul Dujardin, water polo player and Olympic medallist (died 1959)
 27 May – Louis-Ferdinand Céline, writer (died 1961)
 2 June – Jean Gachet, boxer and Olympic medallist (died 1968)
 13 June – Jacques Henri Lartigue, photographer and painter (died 1986)

July to September
 25 July – Yvonne Printemps, singer and actress (died 1977)
 19 August – André Lefèbvre, automobile engineer (died 1963)
 27 August – André Lurçat, architect (died 1970)
 3 September
 Marie Dubas, music-hall singer and comedian (died 1972)
 André Hébuterne, painter (died 1992)
 8 September – Andrée Vaurabourg, pianist and teacher (died 1980)
 14 September – Pierre-Marie Théas, Bishop (died 1977)
 15 September – Jean Renoir, film director (died 1979)

October to December
 17 October – Félix Amiot, aircraft constructor (died 1974)
 25 October – Claude Cahun, photographer and writer (died 1954)
 30 October – Jean Rostand, biologist and philosopher (died 1977)
 4 November – Gabriel Auphan, Admiral (died 1982)
 5 November – René Laforgue, psychiatrist and psychoanalyst (died 1962)
 7 December – Louis Béguet, rugby union player (died 1983)
 19 December – Paul Baudouin, banker, politician and Minister (died 1964)
 25 December – Maurice Floquet, France's oldest man on record (died 2006)

Full date unknown
 Marcel LaFosse, classical trumpeter (died 1969)
 Georges Miquelle, cellist (died 1977)

Deaths
 29 January – Armand Gautier, painter and lithographer (born 1825)
 3 February – Edmond Frémy, chemist (born 1814)
 6 February – Maria Deraismes, author and pioneer for women's rights (born 1828)
 9 February – Maxime Du Camp, writer and photographer (born 1822)
 14 February – Jacques-Léonard Maillet, sculptor (born 1823)
 20 May – Philippe Édouard Foucaux, Tibetologist (born 1811)
 25 June – Marie François Sadi Carnot, President of France (assassinated) (born 1837)
 1 July – Jean-Joseph Carriès, sculptor, ceramist, and miniaturist (born 1855)
 2 September – Pauline Duvernay, dancer (born 1813)
 8 November – Louis Figuier, scientist and writer (born 1819)
 7 December – Ferdinand de Lesseps, developer of the Suez Canal (born 1805)

Full date unknown
 Jacques Claude Demogeot, man of letters (born 1808)

References

1890s in France